Nové Heřminovy is a municipality and village in Bruntál District in the Moravian-Silesian Region of the Czech Republic. It has about 400 inhabitants.

Administrative parts
The village of Kunov is an administrative part of Nové Heřminovy.

References

Villages in Bruntál District